The Riddler (Edward Nigma, later Edward Nygma or Edward Nashton) is a supervillain appearing in American comic books published by DC Comics. The character was created by Bill Finger and Dick Sprang, and debuted in Detective Comics #140 in October 1948. He has become one of the most enduring enemies of the superhero Batman and belongs to the collective of adversaries that make up his rogues gallery.

In his comic book appearances, the Riddler is depicted as a criminal mastermind in Gotham City. He has an obsessive compulsion to incorporate riddles, puzzles, and death traps in his schemes to prove his intellectual superiority over Batman and the police. His real name–Edward Nigma–is a pun itself; an "enigma" is a person or thing that is difficult to understand. With this self-conscious use of an elaborate gimmick, the Riddler's crimes are often theatrical and ostentatious. The character commonly wears a domino mask and either a green unitard decorated with question mark prints or a green suit and bowler hat. A black, green, or purple question mark serves as his visual motif.

The Riddler has been adapted into numerous forms of media, having been portrayed in live action by Frank Gorshin and John Astin on the 1960s television series Batman, Jim Carrey in the 1995 film Batman Forever, Cory Michael Smith on the 2014 Fox series Gotham, and Paul Dano in the 2022 film The Batman. John Glover, Robert Englund, Wally Wingert, and others have provided the character's voice ranging from animation to video games.

Fictional character biography

Golden Age 

The character's origin story recounts Edward Nigma's fascination with puzzles from a young age. After a teacher announces that a contest will be held over who can solve a puzzle the fastest, Nigma sets his sights on winning this, craving the glory and satisfaction that will come with the victory. He breaks into the school at night to practice the puzzle until he is able to solve it in under a minute. Due to this he wins the contest and is given a book of riddles as a prize. His cheating rewarded, Edward embraced the mastery of puzzles of all kinds, eventually becoming a carnival employee who excelled at cheating his customers out of their money with his bizarre puzzles and mind games. He soon finds himself longing for greater challenges and thrills and dons the disguise of the "Riddler" to challenge Batman, believing him to be a worthy adversary. In his first encounter with the Dynamic Duo, Riddler first tried to confound the crime-fighters with his infamous double-entry Riddle Clues and then tried to kill them both in a booby-trapped glass maze on a pier, sealing the door so they couldn't leave the structure before it exploded, only for Batman and Robin to escape and the Riddler "vanishing" after getting knocked into the sea by the explosion, leaving only his trademark "?" floating in the water.

Silver Age 

Riddler's history is the same as his Golden Age counterpart. Riddler once collaborated with Joker and Penguin in using an experimental gas on Batman which turned him into a Bat-Hulk. Metamorpho was able to restore him to normal and they apprehended Riddler, Joker, and Penguin.

Riddler was among the villains recruited by Joker to take down Killer Croc. They were defeated by Batman, Robin, Batgirl, Catwoman, and Talia al Ghul

Post-Crisis
In Batman: The Long Halloween, the Riddler appears as an informant. The Riddler is hired by Carmine "The Roman" Falcone to tell him the identity of the Holiday killer. Falcone eventually loses his patience with Riddler and has his daughter throw him out on the 1st of April. Outside Falcone's he is confronted by the Holiday killer who fires several shots at him without harming him due to it being April Fool's, the killer also leaves several items pertaining to their identity at the scene. This may be why Riddler was left alive, as matters are traditionally reversed on the holiday. He appeared again in the same chapter of the story in which Harvey Dent is disfigured when Batman comes to him for information about the attack.

He plays a slightly larger role in the story's sequel Batman: Dark Victory, in which Batman turns to him to figure out the significance of the lost games of hangman that are left at the scenes of the Hangman killer's crimes. He later showed up as a member of Two-Face's jury during the Hangman's trial.

In Catwoman: When in Rome, he joins Selina Kyle on a trip to Italy in search of his fellow rogue's origins. It is there that he manipulates her into believing that some of Batman's most dangerous foes are after her. He has his henchmen employ several gimmicks and weapons used by the Scarecrow, Mr. Freeze and the Joker to achieve this. He hopes to extract Batman's real identity from her, but to his dismay, she actually doesn't know or care.

The Riddler appears in The Question series, being convinced to become a "big-time villain" by a prostitute he meets on a bus. He hijacks the bus and begins asking riddles, killing and robbing anyone that gets them wrong. Question quickly subdues him by asking him philosophical riddles in return. He is outwitted and has a mental breakdown before being set free as a reward for getting one last riddle right.

In the one-shot "Riddler: The Riddle Factory", the Riddler becomes the host of an underground game show that focuses on digging up dirt on celebrities. Many of the famous people that he humiliates end up committing suicide shortly afterward, suggesting that perhaps Riddler did more than just inspire their deaths. In the end, his actions turn out to be a front for his attempts to find the hidden treasures of "Scarface" Scarpelli, a Gotham City gangster who lived long before Batman's reign of crimefighting.

In the three-part Batman: Legends of the Dark Knight storyline "The Primal Riddle", written by Steve Englehart, the Riddler engineers one of his greatest deathtraps: Batman is thrown into a narrow pit that is slowly filling up with water. The walls are electrically wired, and a set of bumpers are the only thing that prevents the water from touching the walls and causing Batman to die by electrocution. The only options Batman appears to have are death by electrocution and death by drowning, but as always, Batman manages to tamper with the trap's design and develop a route of escape. After Harley Quinn briefly breaks free of her devotion to the Joker, she attempts to hold up a large party at Wayne Manor, only to find that the Riddler is targeting the building also. The two gangs engage in a firefight, but Harley gains the upper hand when Big Barda (who was secretly allied with her at the time) interrupts the conflict and captures the Riddler and his men. During the storyline, Riddler makes constant allusions to a "mystery" that is hidden within the mansion, and after his apprehension, damage done to the building causes the entrance to the Batcave to open. Riddler sees this, and then declares that he has "solved the riddle of Wayne Manor". During this period, he attacks Black Canary and Green Arrow in Star City, and he is easily defeated. This event helps lay the foundations for Riddler's future confrontations with Green Arrow.

During a crisis caused when Wonder Woman's Lasso of Truth was broken, resulting in the laws of truth breaking down and causing reality to be shaped by the perceptions of individuals, one of the symptoms was when Batman found himself unable to solve any of the Riddler's riddles but was nevertheless still able to defeat Riddler as Riddler himself could not solve the riddles eithermost likely reflecting the public idea of Riddler's puzzles being insolubleclaiming that he managed to "improvise" to defeat Riddler. His low reputation among heroes and villains was reflected when the Flash noted that Batman having trouble with Riddler was a clear sign that the world was ending.

Batman: Hush
In the 12-part storyline Batman: Hush, it is revealed that Riddler suffers from cancer (specifically a brain tumor), which also afflicted the mother of Dr. Thomas Elliot. Riddler uses one of Ra's al Ghul's Lazarus Pits to cure himself and offers Elliot the chance to cure his mother as well, provided he pays a large sum of money. However, Elliott is, in fact, eager for his mother to die to inherit her fortune. Elliott, who goes on to secretly become the masked criminal Hush, explains he wants to get revenge on his childhood friend Bruce Wayne. The two of them agree to work together and Riddler sets Killer Croc, Poison Ivy, Harley Quinn, Joker, Clayface, and Scarecrow out to destroy Batman, with Ra's al Ghul, Talia al Ghul, and Lady Shiva being temporarily drawn into the scheme as well.

During the psychotic break that follows exposure to the Lazarus Pit, the Riddler deduces Batman's secret identity; he then reveals his knowledge to Hush. He has Clayface shapeshift into the form of Batman's presumed deceased protégé Jason Todd to torment Batman, who is haunted by the former Robin's death. Batman first thinks that Riddler had stolen Todd's corpse and hidden it, but it was revealed in a later storyline, Batman: Under the Hood, that Todd was alive the whole time and had personally played a role in Riddler and Hush's scheme. When the Riddler threatens to expose Batman's secret identity, the Caped Crusader mockingly labels it an empty threat, pointing out that if Riddler revealed the answer to the riddle "who is Batman?", it would become worthless, something Riddler would not be able to stand. In addition, Batman warns him that if he reveals the secret, it would give Ra's al Ghul a vital clue that he used a Lazarus Pit without his permission, and the League of Assassins would subsequently retaliate against him.

Aftermath
The fallout from the Riddler's failed scheme is played out in Batman: Gotham Knights #50-53. In the story "Pushback", Hush reappears and beats Riddler senseless across a rooftop. Seeking refuge, Riddler goes to the Joker and the Penguin. He offers to tell the Joker who had killed his pregnant wife Jeannie if the Clown Prince of Crime would protect him from Hush. Joker immediately agrees, but eventually, Hush, with the help of the impostor Prometheus, defeats him, forcing Riddler to flee for his life. In Detective Comics #797-799, the Riddler seeks shelter from Poison Ivy only to be humiliated. Riddler and Poison Ivy then face off in a physical duel, which Ivy wins easily.

As revealed in Batman: Legends of the Dark Knight #185-189, the Riddler is stripped of his deductive powers and left to rot as a member of Gotham City's vast and invisible homeless population. A chance encounter with an ex-NSA codebreaker gives him a positive environment in which to recover his mind. During that stay, he experiences an induced flashback that leads him to realize that his father had abused him many years ago. Envious of his son's academic achievements in school, and unable to understand his brilliance, his father believed he had cheated on his accomplishments, and beat him out of jealousy. Once Riddler discovers this, he also realizes that his compulsion is born out of a strong desire, to tell the truth, to prove his innocence of deception. Having made this connection, the Riddler spends some of his vast fortunes, acquired over many years of crime, to get minor plastic surgery and extensive tattooing, covering most of his torso with his trademark question insignia. He returns and kills the codebreakerwho had pieced together his identity but couldn't act on itthen promptly steals a priceless scroll out from under Batman's nose. Since then, Riddler has spent most of his time either legally amassing a huge fortune or attacking various heroes to prove his new-found power.

After orchestrating a brutal series of assaults on Green Arrow, as revenge against his defeat at his hands during the "No Man's Land" era, Riddler gravely injures and almost kills both Green Arrow and Arsenal. He once again escapes before the Outsiders arrive to save them. Sometime between this incident and the events of Hush, Riddler was hired to steal artifacts imbued with mystical powers from one of Star City's museums, and then distract the authorities so that the related rituals could be commenced. He sends Team Arrow on a wild goose chase around the city and then reveals that he has an atomic bomb housed in the stadium where the Star City Rockets play. However, as a side effect of the ritual performed with the artifacts, the city is plunged into complete darkness, and Green Arrow uses this to his advantage, moving in and apprehending the Riddler.

Riddler later shows up in Infinite Crisis #1, with a group of villains, which includes the Fisherman and Murmur, attacking the Gotham City Police Department. He is next seen escaping Arkham Asylum during the worldwide supervillain breakout engineered by Alexander Luthor Jr.'s Secret Society of Super Villains days after the prior supernatural disaster. Riddler reappears as part of the Society's "Phase Three" attack on Metropolis. He is defeated by the Shining Knight and is struck in the head by the Knight's mace.

Riddler reformed
In Detective Comics #822, the first of a series of issues written by veteran Batman writer Paul Dini, the Riddler returns, having spent much of the previous year in a coma due to brain damage after being struck in the head by Shining Knight. When he awakes, he is cured of his insanity and of his obsession with riddles, while retaining both his genius intellect and his mammoth ego. He has seemingly reformed and becomes a private consultant who takes on the murder case of a wealthy socialite. Hired by the socialite's father, he proves that a photo of Bruce Wayne apparently implicating him in the crime depicts an impostor and briefly works with Batman to investigate the crime. He has suffered severe memory loss from the coma, and he barely remembers his own name. He does not appear to remember that Wayne and Batman are one and the same, although he does harbor some suspicions of once knowing something amazing about Wayne.

The Riddler is a guest along with Bruce Wayne on board a ship during a party. During the party, an old friend of Bruce's falls overboard and is mauled to death by sharks. Riddler appears to solve the case with the suicide of the apparent murderer, and quickly takes the credit. However, Batman finds evidence that suicide was a setup to divert attention away from the real killer. Bruce suspects foul play, and eventually tracks down the killer, whom Riddler is also close to catching before Nigma is bludgeoned over the head by a shark-tooth club. The killer pushes Batman out the window and is about to drop him to his death, when Nigma wraps his tie around an arrow, lights it on fire, and shoots it into the killer's back. As the assailant rolls around screaming, Nigma taunts him, refusing to douse the flames. Batman extinguishes the flame and responds to Nigma's assertion that they are now allies with hostile dismissal.

The Riddler is hired by Bruce Wayne to track down an experimental drug developed by Wayne Enterprises, currently being tested for muscle stamina and cellular regeneration, which has been stolen by the lab assistant Lisa Newman. He discovers that Newman is staying at the same Athenian Women's Help Shelter as Harley Quinn. With Harley's help, he defeats Newman and returns the drug to Wayne Enterprises, earning Batman's trust for the time being.

In Countdown #42, Riddler claims to Mary Marvel that he has gone straight and is now a detective. The two join forces to defeat Clayface, and after witnessing Mary's new malicious approach to crime-fighting, suggests that she consider finding a mentor to help her control her powers or at the very least get some anger management counseling. After a serial killer surfaces on the streets of Gotham City, the Riddler homes in on closing the case, only to find that the killer is actually one of his former victims out for revenge. The young man, whose girlfriend was caught in the crossfire of a gunfight between Nigma's gang and security guards, captures Riddler and attempts to kill him, but Batman intervenes just in time and saves his former foe's life.

In the 2008 mini-series Gotham Underground, Riddler investigates the Penguin's involvement with the events of Salvation Run. He saves Dick Grayson working undercover during the Gotham Gang War between Penguin and Tobias Whale and deduces that Grayson is Nightwing.
He appears in Battle for the Cowl: The Underground, where he is hired by the Penguin to find Black Mask. To that end, he tracks down Selina Kyle, meeting up with Harley Quinn and Poison Ivy in the process.

In the Gotham City Sirens storyline, Poison Ivy is controlling the Riddler, keeping him in a nearly vegetative state so she can move into his house. When a villain named Boneblaster decides to make a name for himself by killing Catwoman, the fight ends up there. The house is severely damaged, but Riddler is freed from Ivy's control in the process. Seeing his house in shambles, he takes his question mark cane off the wall and begins to savagely beat the already downed Boneblaster. In the third issue, Riddler attempts to solve a pair of unlikely suicides, the first being the second-best female tennis player in the world, the second an ace race car driver. During his re-enactment of one of the deaths, he is visited by both Catwoman and Poison Ivy, seeking his help in locating Harley after her abduction. Due to the events of the first issue, and Harley's mental state, he quickly declines and brushes off Poison Ivy's threats.

In his efforts, he discovers that these deaths are in fact homicides orchestrated by a serial killer who leaves subtle clues to the next victim within the body and time of death of the current victim. While attempting to alert the media, he provokes Dick Grayson, who is now acting as Batman. Almost instantly, Riddler deduces that the Batman before him is a new one. Additionally, Riddler reveals that the next victim will be the sister of the second victim, a young romance writer, something that Dick needed Alfred Pennyworth and the Batcave computer to figure out. In the end, Dick goes off to confront the killer, while Riddler agrees to look after the intended victim. After a brief, but an expected misunderstanding about Riddler's intentions with the young woman, Dick phones in to announce that he has apprehended and questioned not one, but three killers about their intentions, but got no answers. Riddler almost leaves the woman to her life, when the lights go out unexpectedly. Riddler immediately concludes that Dick has not captured all of the killers, and pulls the woman out of harm's way when a bomb goes off in front of her bookstore.

While Riddler and the writer hide as the smoke clears, three costumed assailants, enter the wreckage, looking for their victim to mark with their next riddle. The two men are led by a woman going by the moniker Conundrum, and their costumes sport black and green color schemes along with disturbingly familiar question mark emblazoned on their outfits. As Riddler stealthily disposes of the two grunts with his cane, Conundrum takes the writer hostage at gunpoint. Riddler deduces that Conundrum and her men are all college students who specialize in police sciences. Due to his famous rehabilitation, Conundrum's group decided to fill the void with their debut murders. Conundrum admits that Riddler was her idol and that it would be a shame to kill him.

At this point, Riddler announces that Batman is en route to their very location, something both Conundrum and the writer have difficulty believing. Riddler claims that since his reform, he and Batman have become close and that his cane now has its own GPS that alerts Batman to his location whenever the question mark is twisted. Noting her disbelief, Riddler calmly asks Conundrum with a smirk, "Why is this man smiling?". Just as the Riddler finishes his question, Dick shows up and knocks Conundrum out. Riddler then admits that he is completely baffled that Batman is indeed there since he was only stalling for time until he thought of something, leading him to wonder if there truly is a Bat-signal in his cane (a panel during Riddler's "bluff" shows that there is indeed a Bat-signal in his cane, as a green question mark alongside a map shows up inside the Batmobile's window). After the ordeal is over, the young writer hugs Riddler, thanking him for saving her life. Afterward, she and Riddler go out to dinner at a fancy restaurant, under Dick's covert surveillance. Dick admits that Riddler is indeed on a path of recovery, but must still be watched. After washing up in the men's room, Riddler sees a gossip show on closed-circuit television, showcasing a plainclothes Harley getting into a car with Hush disguised as Bruce Wayne. He then calls Selina and tells her to turn on her television. Sometime later, Riddler arrives at his office to find his secretary bound and gagged at her desk, with Harley, Ivy, and Selina waiting in his office. The women tell him that they are being framed for the murder of a young woman whose body was dropped into their pool, and they need his help to prove that they had no part in it. After examining the woman's body, he finds that the women were telling the truth, only to be attacked by Dr. Aesop.

Return to villainy
In Tony Daniel's "Life After Death", Riddler appears early in the story at a gala party attended by Arkham, Dick Grayson, Huntress, and Oracle, hired by Penguin to find the Black Mask. As he chases Catgirl away from her robbery of the venue, the Riddler is rocked by a bomb detonation, the trauma re-awakening his psychosis. Cackling, rambling and insane, he terminates his contract with Cobblepot and disappears. In "Riddle Me This", the Riddler still "acts" as a private eye and teams with Batman to solve the murders of a mysterious sorcerer named Sebastian Rothschild (aka Sebastian Blackspell). Blackspell is apprehended, but only after Batman suspects Riddler went to great lengths to orchestrate the ordeal, including poisoning himself with a nearly lethal dose of Joker gas to skirt suspicion and act on a grudge between him and Blackspell.

Riddler's return to villainy is cemented in "Eye of the Beholder". Investigating the Sensei's attack on the Jade Society, Batman (Dick Grayson) is ambushed by Riddler and a young woman introduced as Enigma, Riddler's daughter. Riddler and Enigma escape, delivering the Jade Society member list to Gilda Dent. Riddler is paid but is more interested in another reward, which Gilda promises after one more job. This occurs in "Pieces", where Gilda reveals herself to her estranged husband Harvey, who is now the disfigured criminal Two-Face. She hires Riddler and Enigma to help Two-Face best Mario Falcone and reclaim his coin. The plan works; Riddler and Enigma defeat Batman and reunite the Dents. The Riddler is rewarded with multiple dossiers of himself. When Enigma calls him a has-been, Riddler retorts with a new riddle: "What's green and purple and bleeds profusely?". Enigma's response is cut short by her scream, implying that the Riddler has murdered his own daughter.

The New 52
In 2011, "The New 52" rebooted the DC universe. Riddler appears as an inmate at Arkham Asylum in Batman (vol. 2) #1. Redesigned in the style of the new titles, he sports a green mohawk in the shape of a question mark. Riddler appears in more traditional form in the short that concludes Batman #15 "And Here's the Kicker", the third part of "Death of the Family". After it is revealed that Joker has secretly hijacked Arkham Asylum, Riddler is depicted as a current inmate, calmly biding his time and taunting guards. But when Joker appears and reveals his great respect for Riddler (as the villain whose dangerous intellect has kept Batman "sharp"), he uses Joker-gas to force Riddler to prove he could have escaped his cell anytime he wanted. To his chagrin, Riddler does and becomes quite alarmed when Joker shares a write-up of his plan to ambush Batman. Joker admits Riddler will have little part in his designs but should stick around for the "show" anyway.

The Riddler made an appearance in Batman (vol. 2) #21, the opening book of the "Zero Year" arc, where his surname is changed from Edward Nigma to Nashton or Nygma. The Riddler later appears in both the second and third chapters of the "Zero Year" storyline. In the canon, the Riddler is Batman's first masked supervillain and is not only able to best Batman twice, but also takes control of Gotham, causing it to become a flooded wasteland where only the intelligent are meant to survive. Although the Riddler continues to be steps ahead of the Dark Knight, he is eventually defeated by the combined efforts of Batman, Commissioner James Gordon and Wayne Enterprises CEO Lucius Fox. He is later moved to Arkham Asylum.

Riddler appeared one more time in New 52 in the last three issues of The Flash. Holding a presumed dead Heat Wave hostage, it is revealed that the Riddler designed a range of deadly drones around Central City, drones that he had out-sourced to the CCPD. Alongside the Trickster (whose arm Edward had placed a bomb in), Riddler begins ruthlessly punching and beating the Flash (Barry Allen) before the speedster is quickly rescued by the Pied Piper. Riddler then threatens to have his drones open fire on the citizens of Central City once more. However, he is eventually defeated and imprisoned by a uniformed effort between the Flash and the Rogues.

DC Rebirth
In 2016, DC Comics implemented another relaunch of its books called "DC Rebirth", which restored its continuity to a form much as it was prior to "The New 52". The Riddler makes his first true appearance in the new DC continuity relaunch in Batman (vol. 3)  #19. An inmate of Arkham once again, he rather cooperatively assists Bane in unlocking a high tech door, allowing Bane access to confront Batman.

In the eight-part story arc "The War of Jokes and Riddles", commencing with Batman (vol. 3) #25, flashbacks to a year after the events of "Zero Year" have Batman recounting the details of a war between Riddler and Joker. He is first seen in custody at the GCPD, assisting them in solving a variety of crimes, including locating Joker's whereabouts, before stabbing a police officer to death 26 times. Blackmailing the approaching guards with details of their children and families, Riddler walks out freely before intruding into Joker's office. Riddler seemingly offers the Joker a partnership, acknowledging that if either of the two men individually kills Batman, the other will be left forever unsatisfied. However the Joker shoots Riddler in the stomach and quickly departs, Batman appearing through the window and giving chase. Left in a pool of his own blood, Riddler rose to his feet and limped out of the office, seemingly unfazed. Edward quickly healed from the wound, carving a question marked shaped scar over the wound, before murdering Dr. Jaime Knowles. Riddler is then seen meeting with Poison Ivy, discussing the Joker's need to rid anyone who could potentially kill Batman before him. The duo is then ambushed by gunmen working for Carmine Falcone under the orders of the Joker to kill Riddler within the hour. However, Poison Ivy attacks the gunmen with her vines, allowing Edward and herself to leave.

Riddler eventually formed his team, consisting of himself, Poison Ivy, Scarecrow, Deathstroke, Clayface, Killer Croc, Two-Face, Firefly, and Victor Zsasz. Waging war on Joker's team across Gotham, Riddler is responsible for poisoning Charles Brown's son, resulting in his transformation into Kite Man who joins up with Joker's team consisting of Cluemaster, Deadshot, Mad Hatter, Man-Bat, Mr. Freeze, Penguin, Solomon Grundy, and Ventriloquist. The war continues, with Riddler and Joker claiming territories across Gotham, before Riddler, who had convinced Batman to side with him during the conflict, blackmails and interrogates Kite Man into giving up Joker's location. However Batman, after a brief fight between him, Riddler and Joker, becomes disgusted by Riddler's actions and quickly grabs a blade, breaking his one rule of no killing to stab Riddler. However, Joker, who finally begins to laugh again, prevents Batman from doing so.

The present-day Riddler shows up next as a member of the Secret Society of Super Villains who have placed Deathstroke on trial for appearing to have reformed. Riddler, using Hector Hammond's abilities, convinces the Society that Deathstroke is indeed evil by showcasing a simulation of Deathstroke killing them all right before Deathstroke himself is kidnapped.

In the Watchmen sequel Doomsday Clock, Riddler hosts an underground meeting with the other villains to talk about the Superman Theory. The meeting is crashed by Comedian who shoots Riddler in the leg.

Infinite Frontier
Riddler features in the Infinite Frontier one-shot Batman - One Bad Day: The Riddler #1, wherein he is given a revised origin. Here he is named Edward Tierney, a child prodigy with a genius level intellect who attends a prestigious private college where his father is the headmaster. Edward is a socially awkward child seemingly without social contacts besides his father, who pushes him extremely harshly in his studies. He also regularly beats and humiliates Edward due to him being the shameful result of a short lived affair with a prostitute. When Edward fails to get a full score on a test that ends with an unrelated riddle, he is beaten and humiliated even more. Edward tries to commit suicide, fails, and instead sneaks into the school archives and steals the test key for the upcoming course. The teacher finds out and is set to expel Edward from the school. He notes that getting expelled might actually be good for Edward, as he'll still be brilliant but will also have experienced failure and might become a bit more relaxed. Hearing this, Edward snaps and beats the teacher to death. This sets Edward on the way to adopting the "Nygma" surname and becoming the Riddler. Due to other events in the story, it is unlikely that it is meant to be considered as canonical.

Characterization

Skills and abilities

The Riddler is a criminal genius capable of extraordinary lateral thinking in decoding and formulating puzzles of all kinds. As a private detective during the time he was reformed, he demonstrated investigative skills that rival those of the Dark Knight. However, Batman's observations note that "[Nigma] exhibits personality disorders consistent with a fanatic narcissist, egocentrism, and megalomania crossed with severe obsessive compulsion".

Like most of Batman's enemies (and Batman himself), the Riddler has no superhuman abilities but is a highly cunning criminal strategist. He is not especially talented in fisticuffs (although his endurance has grown from having to engage in it over the years), but sometimes employs weaponry that exploits his gimmick, such as exploding jigsaw pieces, question-mark-shaped pistols, and his infamous question-mark staff, known to house a wide variety of technological devices and weapons. He is shown to be skilled with engineering and technology, having confronted Batman and Robin with unique and elaborate deathtraps. He is also well known for being Batman's most intelligent adversary, and with a flexible theme to his crimes compared to similar criminals: all the Riddler requires is to be able to describe his threatened crime with a riddle or puzzle. Riddler once tried to commit crimes without leaving any clues using self hypnosis; however, he learned too late that while he was asleep his unconscious mind left riddling clues, causing Batman and Robin to capture him. Riddler has a grudging respect for Batman in that he is the only adversary that has an intellectual genius equal to the Riddler; in the episode of Batman the animated series titled "What is Reality"? Riddler came close to defeating Batman once and for all; when Batman was forced to engage in a mind battle of the intellect versus the Riddler after Riddler "captured" Jim Gordon's mind in a virtual reality computer, Batman not only saved Gordon but also gave Riddler a riddle of his own: How could Riddler spread his consciousness 32 times more than Batman and still keep the mental concentration to keep his virtual world "Riddlerville" together? The answer was that the Riddler couldn't keep his "Virtual World together" and instead suffered an emotional breakdown with his mind trapped in the virtual computer world until his next appearance.

However, the threat that Riddler actually poses is somewhat inconsistent across his various stories. His most formidable depictions emphasize his intelligence and cunning, portraying him as one of few rogues capable of seriously taxing Batman's mental prowess, while also willing to take the precaution of obtaining firearms to deal with the superhero. Some recent depictions, however, have placed a derogatory focus on his flamboyant gimmickry and relative lack of major victories (even despite this applying to most of Batman's enemies), portraying him as petty, overconfident, relatively harmless, and held in low esteem. The latter approach has proved polarizing, with some fans finding it wasteful in light of the character's classic status and history of compelling stories, while others argue that most of his popularity has come from media other than his comic storylines and enjoy the notion of knowing that his "real" threat level is overrated. Since The New 52 reboot, Riddler has been consistently depicted as a serious threat, with notable successes.

Relationships
The Riddler develops a working relationship with the Cluemaster, although he initially resents the villain for seemingly copying his modus operandi. In their first encounter, he sets his fellow rogue up with a bomb and sends Batman off chasing riddles that would lead to its defusing, as well as away from his real plan: to steal a vast amount of priceless baseball merchandise. The two team up on a few occasions afterward and work together on a big scheme shortly before Cluemaster's apparent death in the pages of The Suicide Squad.

Other versions
As one of Batman's most famed and popular adversaries, a number of alternate universes in DC Comics publications allow writers to introduce variations on the Riddler that are not part of the official DC continuity, variations in which the character's origins, behavior, and morality differ from the mainstream setting.

Joker

A radically different interpretation of the Riddler is featured in Brian Azzarello and Lee Bermejo's Joker. In this version, he wears a solid green jacket with question marks on the very back of it and a circle of question mark tattoos around his abdomen. His cane serves the purpose of helping to prop him up, due to a disabled leg. In the story, he sells an unknown substance to the Joker, who identifies him as "Edward".

Thrillkiller
In the Elseworlds miniseries Thrillkiller, Nygma is a psychiatrist who counsels Barbara Gordon. Doctor Edward Nygma, author of Riddle Me This — What Do We Really Mean?, keeps Barbara dosed with increasing amounts of Valium and encourages her to mix with people that she actually loathes. Edward wears a green suit and the cushions of his couch bear the pattern of the Riddler's outfit. Alfred, Barbara's butler, takes the drugs away from her at the request of her father Commissioner Gordon, who considers Edward to be a quack.

Batman: Earth One
The Riddler appears in the graphic novel series Batman: Earth One. This version of the character is a nameless serial killer who puts people in life-threatening situations, all while questioning them in riddles, claiming that if they get it right, he will spare them; in fact, this is all a ruse, as he kills them regardless of whether they answer the riddles he proposes or not. Even though he is not obsessed with finding answers to most riddles, the Riddler does have an obsession with learning the Batman's identity, which he considers to be the "ultimate riddle".

In Volume Two, six months after the death of Mayor Oswald Cobblepot, the Riddler goes on a killing spree in Gotham City, hoping to get Batman's attention. After a bombing, Batman chases the Riddler, but falls off a roof in the process of attempting to catch him. Though Batman finds the Riddler's sewer-based hideout, he fails to stop him from bombing a rapid transit train. Using discovered clues, Batman deduces that these killings were not random; they were actually targeted, specifically that the Riddler is targeting the people who are trying to take over the remains of Cobblepot's criminal network. Bruce is later accused of being the Riddler after the real Riddler frames him in an attempt to divert James Gordon's investigation, but Jessica Dent is able to provide Bruce an alibi so he is not arrested. In the middle of a riot at the police precinct caused by the Riddler, Batman pursues the villain in a car chase and eventually subdues him with Waylon Jones' help. The Riddler is subsequently arrested by the Gotham City Police Department and brought up on 43 charges of murder.

Batman/Judge Dredd: The Ultimate Riddle
In the Batman/Judge Dredd crossover Batman/Judge Dredd: The Ultimate Riddle, the Riddler uses a reality-manipulating wand-like device he acquired during the Zero Hour crisis to pull Batman, Dredd, and six alien warriors together, intending to pit Batman against the other warriors and get him killed. However, Batman and Dredd are able to work together to overcome their opponents, culminating in Dredd shooting Riddler in the shoulder and Batman claiming the device, subsequently using it to return the survivors home.

Justice
The Riddler's appearance in Alex Ross' 12 issue series Justice suggests a new motivation, that, as a child, he had been beaten by his father whenever he told a lie, to the extent that he was now psychologically incapable of telling a lie. His riddles are his method of subverting his condition so that he is still technically telling the truth, but always in as cryptic a manner as possible.

Antimatter Universe
The Riddler has a heroic counterpart in the antimatter universe called the Quizmaster, who is a member of Lex Luthor's Justice Underground (that Earth's version of the Injustice Gang) which opposes the evil Crime Syndicate of Amerika. He first appeared in JLA Secret Files 2004 #1. He later has the right half of his face burned by Ultraman, leading him to don a half-face and temporarily take on the name "Enigma". He last appeared in the Trinity series. As the New Earth Riddler slowly became a lighter, less criminal figure, Enigma became a darker figure in this series, attempting to join forces with Despero and Morgaine le Fay to perform a ritual that will allow them to 'supplant' the Trinity of Superman, Batman and Wonder Woman and gain the power to manipulate the multiverse. In the course of the series, it is revealed that Enigma seeks this power to save his daughter after she was mortally injured, but the ritual fails when Despero is replaced by one of his henchmen in an attempted coup, creating an imbalance that destabilizes reality until Trinity's allies can regain enough of their own memories to help their loved ones come back to themselves. Similarly, on Earth-3, the Riddler's heroic counterpart (simply Riddler) is married to Three-Face (Evelyn Dent) and is the stepfather to the Jokester's daughter Duela Dent.

Emperor Joker
In the "Emperor Joker" storyline, the all-powerful Joker creates an alternate Riddler, known as "Enigma", to be a member of the Joker's League of Anarchy along with alternate versions of Poison Ivy and Bizarro. After learning of the Joker's plans to destroy the universe, he leads the League in an uprising against him. The Joker's vast and amazing powers cause the plan to fail, and the entire League is destroyed as a result.

Batman: The Dark Knight Strikes Again
The Riddler can be heard saying "ruh-riddle me this" in Batman: The Dark Knight Strikes Again.

Kingdom Come
The Riddler appears in the miniseries Kingdom Come, having been invited to a meeting of the Mankind Liberation Front by Lex Luthor. In this alternate future, the Riddler has become an old, bald man wearing glasses with question mark-shaped rims. He still indulges in his habitual riddling, asking "Who is the Riddler?" when Luthor referred to him by his real name. He appears to have been invited to the meeting only upon the insistence of Selina Kyle, as Luthor does not appear enthused by his presence.

Batman: Crimson Mist
In the third issue of the Batman vampire series Batman: Crimson Mist, the Riddler appears in a morgue where he shoots the mortician who was about to start an autopsy on a corpse where the Riddler had stored a large number of drugs. The Riddler in that appearance has a big question mark-shaped scar on his face and another one on his chest with his navel being the dot. While shooting he cites what would be his final riddle: "When Genius becomes dope plus 'E' how does she redeem herself? Answer: By turning 'Heroine' which minus the E is 'Heroin', lots of it and redeemable for lots of cash," at which vampire Batman appears and scolds the Riddler for graduating from robbery and extortion to drug trafficking and murder. In a panic, the Riddler begins to fire at Batman only to find that his bullets have no effect on him. Stunned, the Riddler asks Batman what he is, to which Batman replies: "The answer to life's every riddle: death and hungry darkness." With that, Batman proceeds to drain the Riddler of his blood.

Batman/Teenage Mutant Ninja Turtles
In the Batman/Teenage Mutant Ninja Turtles crossover, Riddler is turned into a mutant raccoon by the Shredder, along with other mutated inmates of Arkham Asylum. After Shredder being defeated by Batman and the Turtles, the police scientists have managed to turn him and the rest of inmates at Arkham back to normal and are currently in A.R.G.U.S. custody.

Batman: White Knight
The Riddler made a minor appearance in the 2017 series Batman: White Knight. Riddler, along with several other Batman villains, is tricked by Jack Napier (who in this reality was a Joker who had been force-fed an overdose of pills by Batman, which temporarily cured him of his insanity) into drinking liquids that had been laced with particles from Clayface's body. This was done so that Napier, who was using Mad Hatter's technology to control Clayface, could control them by way of Clayface's ability to control parts of his body that had been separated from him. Riddler and the other villains are then used to attack a library that Napier himself was instrumental in building in one of Gotham City's poorer districts. Later on in the story, the control hat is stolen by the Neo-Joker (the second Harley Quinn, who felt that Jack Napier was a pathetic abnormality, while the Joker was the true, beautiful personality), in an effort to get Napier into releasing the Joker persona. Riddler also appears in the sequel storyline Batman: Curse of the White Knight, being among the villains murdered by Azrael.

In other media

See also
 List of Batman family enemies
 Enigma (DC Comics)
 Batman rapist – An unidentified English serial rapist nicknamed "The Riddler"

References

External links

 Riddler at DC Comics' official website
 
 Edward Nygma's Puzzle Web Site : puzzles, games and stories featuring the animated series Riddler.

DC Comics male supervillains
Villains in animated television series
Batman characters
Characters created by Bill Finger
Characters created by Dick Sprang
Comics characters introduced in 1948
DC Comics LGBT supervillains
DC Comics scientists
DC Comics television characters
Fictional bisexual males
Fictional characters with obsessive–compulsive disorder
Fictional crime bosses
Fictional escapologists
Fictional filicides
Superhero film characters
Male film villains
Fictional forensic scientists
Fictional hackers
Fictional inventors
Fictional kidnappers
Fictional mass murderers
Fictional roboticists
Fictional torturers
Golden Age supervillains
Video game bosses
Fictional mad scientists
Action film villains